
From 1970 to 1979, the Edmonton Eskimos won three Grey Cups. During the decade, the Eskimos compiled a record of 107 wins, 61 losses, and 4 ties. One of the highlights of the decade was the start of a streak of five consecutive Grey Cup championships. The streak started in 1978.

1970

The Eskimos offense had 291 points for, while the defense had 303 points allowed

Schedule

Postseason

Awards and honors
Annis Stukus Trophy – Ray Jauch

1971

The Eskimos offense had 237 points for, while the defense had 305 points allowed

Schedule

Awards and honors
Dick Dupuis, Defensive Back, CFL All-Star

1972

The Eskimos offense had 386 points for, while the defense had 376 points allowed

Schedule

Postseason

Awards and honors
Dave Gasser, Linebacker, CFL All-Star

1973

The Eskimos offense had 372 points for, while the defense had 329 points allowed

Schedule

Postseason

Awards and honors
CFL's Most Outstanding Player Award – George McGowan (WR)

1974

The Eskimos offense had 383 points for, while the defense had 294 points allowed

Schedule

Postseason

Awards and honors
CFL's Most Outstanding Player Award – Tom Wilkinson (QB)

1975

1976

The Eskimos offense had 338 points for, while the defense had 402 points allowed

Schedule

Postseason

Awards and honors
George McGowan, Wide Receiver, CFL All-Star

1977

The Eskimos offense had 447 points for, while the defense had 362 points allowed

Schedule

Postseason

Awards and honors
CFL's Most Outstanding Defensive Player Award – Danny Kepley (LB)

1978

1979

References

External links
 Official website

Edmonton Elks seasons